William Lele was the member of Parliament for Great Grimsby in 1406.

References 

Year of birth missing
Year of death missing
English MPs 1406
Members of the Parliament of England for Great Grimsby